Trichinopoly cigar, also called Trichies or Tritchies, is a type of cheroot associated with the town of Tiruchirappalli in Tamil Nadu, India. The Trichinopoly cigar was actually manufactured from tobacco grown near the town of Dindigul near the present-day Tiruchirappalli and formed one of India's main items of export during the Victorian era.

Winston Churchill, noted for his fondness of cigars, was said to prefer the mildly aromatic Trichy cigar over the heavy pungent smell of Havanas.

Trichinopoly cigars in literature and cinema 
In “the Story of the House with the Green Blinds”, a sub-section of “The Rajah’s Diamond”, itself a sub-section of New Arabian Nights” by Robert Louis Stevenson, Mr. Vandeleur “was smoking a Trichinopoli cigar in the veranda.” [Pentlandite Edition, Cassell & Company 1906, p. 157]

In Chapter 3 of A Study In Scarlet by Arthur Conan Doyle, Sherlock Holmes provides a description of a culprit: "He was more than six feet high, was in the prime of life, had small feet for his height, wore coarse, square-toed boots and smoked a Trichinopoly cigar."

In Chapter 20 of "The Cat's Eye: A Dr. John Thorndyke Story", by R. Austin Freeman, Dr. Thorndyke remarks that at the end of a case, he will "usually smoke a Trichinopoly Cigar."  In Chapter XIII of The Red Thumb Mark by the same author, the villain, knowing Dr Thorndyke's partiality for Trichinopoly cigars, tries to murder him by sending him a poisoned specimen.

In Chapter III of The Unpleasantness at the Bellona Club, by Dorothy L. Sayers, Lord Peter Wimsey has been drinking an expensive old port and comments disparagingly on "a fellow who polluted it with a Trichinopoly."

In the Father Brown story "The Salad of Colonel Cray" by G. K. Chesterton, Colonel Cray recounts a story about their service in India and "asked Putnam if he could get some Trichinopoli cigars".

In Alfred Hitchcock's 1938 film The Lady Vanishes, Gilbert, role-playing Sherlock Holmes, jokingly offers Iris Henderson a trichinopoly cigar: "For that, my dear Watson, you too have a Trichinopoly cigar." What he hands her from inside his jacket is a fountain pen.

Notes

References 
 
 

Culture of Tiruchirappalli
Cigars